Philippe Saint-Jean (born 13 May 1954) is a Belgian football manager.

References

1954 births
Living people
Belgian football managers
A.F.C. Tubize managers
R.A.E.C. Mons managers
Royal Excel Mouscron managers
People from Braine-l'Alleud
Sportspeople from Walloon Brabant